Félix Chopin (1813-1892) was a French bronze designer.

Early life
Félix Chopin was born in 1813 in Paris, France.

Career
Chopin moved to Saint Petersburg in 1838. He designed a chandelier in Vladimir Hall, in the Grand Kremlin Palace, in Moscow. He also designed a chandelier in the Peterhof Palace.

Chopin designed several artpieces with Eugene Lanceray. For example, they designed a sculpture of a horse, which is now in the Museum of Fine Arts, Boston.

Death
He died in 1892.

References

1813 births
1892 deaths
Metalsmiths from Paris
Artists from Saint Petersburg
French expatriates in Russia